The Wild Life is the second studio album by American rock band Slaughter. It was released in 1992 by Chrysalis Records. Album cover design by John Kosh.

The album produced the hit singles "The Wild Life", "Days Gone By" and "Real Love". It was certified gold.

The album debuted at Number 8 on the Billboard 200 album Charts.

Track listing

Personnel
Slaughter
Mark Slaughter – vocals, guitar, keyboards, piano
Tim Kelly – guitar
Dana Strum – bass
Blas Elias – drums

Session members
A.T. Das – guitar
James SK Wān – bamboo flute

Production
Scott Cadwallader – production coordination
Jeff Clark – engineering
Gene Kirkland – photography
Scott Lovelis – engineering
Bob Ludwig – mastering
Jeff Moses – engineering, mixing assistant
John Schmit – mixing assistant

Charts

Album

Singles and album tracks

References 

Slaughter (band) albums
1992 albums
Chrysalis Records albums